Manon Capelle is a Belgian actress. She made her film debut in All Cats Are Grey (2014), in which she starred alongside Bouli Lanners and Anne Coesens. The film received nine nominations at the 6th Magritte Awards, including Most Promising Actress for Capelle.

Filmography 
 2014: All Cats Are Grey - Dorothy
 2017: Art of Crime (TV series) - Noémie (Stéphanie Lombard, age 17)
 2018: L'ecole est finie  Cindy
 2018: Through the Fire - Lili et Maya bébés
 2019: Never Grow Old - Emily Crabtree.
 2021: Le chemin du bonheur Eve
 2022: Oxymort (short) - Louise

References

External links

Living people
Belgian film actresses
Year of birth missing (living people)